Guild v IRC was an English trusts law case dealing with charitable trusts which confirmed that recreational facilities open to the public could be valid charities.

Facts
Guild was the executor of the estate of James Russell, who left his estate "for the use in connection with the sports centre in New Berwick or some similar purpose in connection with sport". The Inland Revenue held that the trust created did not constitute a charitable trust, and as such was subject to the Finance Act 1975. Since the Income and Corporation Taxes Act 1970 interpretation of "charity" was to be used, English trusts law was applied.

After an initial hearing in the Court of Session, the case was appealed to the House of Lords.

Judgment
The House of Lords held that recreational facilities counted as charitable trusts. Lord Keith, giving the sole opinion, applied the Recreational Charities Act 1958, which provides that recreational facilities providing "social welfare" to people from social disadvantages or the general members of the public were appropriate charitable trusts. The question was whether the "social welfare" element also applied to recreational facilities open to the general public. Lord Keith rejected this, saying the following.

See also
Charitable trusts in English law

References

Bibliography

1992 in case law
1992 in British law
English trusts case law
House of Lords cases
Charity law
Court of Session cases
Charitable trusts